Luis Lopez or López may refer to:

People

Arts and Entertainment
Luis López (editor) (fl. 1637–1649), editor and publisher of Aragonese works in the Spanish language
Luis López Nieves (born 1950), Puerto Rican author

Politics
Luis López de la Torre Ayllón y Kirsmacker (1799–1875), Spanish nobleman and diplomat
Luis Félix López (1932–2008), Ecuadorian doctor, politician and writer

Science and Academics
Luis López de Mesa (1884–1967), Colombian doctor and professor

Sports

Athletics
Luis Fernando López (born 1979), Colombian race walker 
Luis López (sprinter) (born 1988), Puerto Rican sprinter and medalist at the 2010 Ibero-American Championships in Athletics
Luis Ángel López (born 1991), Puerto Rican racewalker and medalist at the 2011 Central American and Caribbean Championships in Athletics
Luis Lopez (Salvadoran racewalker) (born 1994), Salvadorian race walker

Baseball
Luis Lopez (catcher) (born 1964), American baseball player
Luis López (infielder) (born 1970), Puerto Rican baseball player
Luis Lopez (third baseman) (born 1973), American baseball player

Cycling
Luis López (cyclist), Uruguayan Olympic cyclist (1948)
Luis Alfredo López (cyclist) (born 1966), Colombian road cyclist

Football
Luis López (Chilean footballer) (1924–2012)
Luis López (footballer, born 1951), Guatemalan football manager and former midfielder
Luis López (football manager, born 1961), Uruguayan football manager
Luis López Rekarte (born 1962), Spanish football right-back
Luis López (footballer, born January 1975), Spanish football defender
Luis López (footballer, born May 1975), Spanish football midfielder
Luis López (footballer, born 1979) (born 1979), Argentine football midfielder
Luis López (footballer, born 1983) (born 1983), Dominican football centre-back
Luis López (footballer, born 1984) (born 1984), Uruguayan football goalkeeper
Luis López (footballer, born 1986) (born 1986), Honduran football forward
Luis López (footballer, born 1987) (born 1987), Argentine football forward
Luis López (footballer, born 1992) (born 1992), Mexican football midfielder
Luis López (footballer, born September 1993), Honduran football goalkeeper
Luis López (footballer, born August 1993), Mexican football centre-back
Luis López (Nicaraguan footballer) (born 1998)
Luis López (footballer, born 1999), Mexican football goalkeeper
Luis López (footballer, born 2001), Spanish footballer

Other sports
Luis López (sailor) (born 1955), Spanish Olympic sailor
Luis López (gymnast) (1969–1995), Mexican Olympic gymnast

Places 
Luis Lopez, New Mexico, United States

Fictional 
Luis Lopez-Fitzgerald, fictional character on soap opera Passions
Luis Lopez (GTA), protagonist of Grand Theft Auto: The Ballad of Gay Tony

See also
José Luis López (disambiguation)
Luís Lopes (born 2000), Portuguese football forward